Sang (Jadhang) is a small hilly village in Uttarkashi District, Uttarakhand, India, and claimed by Zanda County, Ngari Prefecture, Tibet, China. A tributary of the Jadh Ganga, itself an important tributary of the Bhagirathi River, flows through this place. 

Mana Pass and some of the nearby villages are Tirpani, Nelang and Pulam Sumda, which all lie in the valley of the Jadh Ganga.

Geography 

See geography of Dhumku, Nelang, Pulam Sumda, Sumla and Mana Pass area and geography of Mana.

History

Territorial dispute 

The valley of the Jadh Ganga is claimed by China.

Culture

This area is are inhabited by the Char Bhutia tribe who practice Tibetan Buddhism.

See also
 India-China Border Roads 
 Line of Actual Control
 List of disputed territories of India

References

Cities and towns in Uttarkashi district